Julian Melchiori (born December 6, 1991) is a Canadian professional ice hockey defenseman who is currently playing with Eisbären Berlin in the Deutsche Eishockey Liga (DEL). He was selected in the third round, 87th overall, in the 2010 NHL Entry Draft by the Atlanta Thrashers.

Playing career
On March 16, 2012, Melchiori as a Thrashers' draft pick signed a three-year entry level contract with the relocated Winnipeg Jets. Melchiori made his NHL debut on December 27, 2013, playing 8:41 of ice time with the Winnipeg Jets in a 6–4 home game win over the Minnesota Wild. On July 2, 2016, he re-signed with the Jets on a two-year, two-way contract.

Having played the first 6 years of his professional career within the Jets organization, Melchiori left as a free agent following the 2017–18 campaign, in which he spent exclusively with affiliate, the Manitoba Moose of the AHL. On July 13, 2018, Melchiori agreed to a one-year, two-way contract with the Florida Panthers.

As a free agent Melchiori left the Panthers after one season and signed a one-year contract to continue his career in the AHL with the Binghamton Devils, affiliate to the New Jersey Devils on July 23, 2019. In the 2019–20 season, Melchiori collected 13 points through 54 games on the blueline for Binghamton before he was signed to a one-year, two-way contract with the New Jersey Devils for the remainder of the season on February 23, 2020.

With the season ended prematurely due to the COVID-19 pandemic, Melchiori left the Devils as a free agent to embark on a career abroad by agreeing to a one-year contract with Russian club, HC Neftekhimik Nizhnekamsk of the Kontinental Hockey League, on July 18, 2020. Melchiori was later released from his contract with Neftekhimik without appearing for the club, opting to move to Germany, in signing a one-year contract with Grizzlys Wolfsburg of the DEL on November 10, 2020.

After two seasons in Wolfsburg, Melchiori left the club and continued his career in Germany by signing a two-year contract with Eisbären Berlin on May 19, 2022.

Personal life
He is the nephew of NHL hockey player, Mike Murphy.

Career statistics

References

External links

1991 births
Living people
Atlanta Thrashers draft picks
Binghamton Devils players
Canadian ice hockey defencemen
Canadian people of Italian descent
Eisbären Berlin players
Grizzlys Wolfsburg players
Ice hockey people from Ontario
Kitchener Rangers players
Manitoba Moose players
Oshawa Generals players
Sportspeople from Richmond Hill, Ontario
Springfield Thunderbirds players
St. John's IceCaps players
Winnipeg Jets players